Polymeridium xanthoexcentricum is a species of corticolous (bark-dwelling), crustose lichen in the family Trypetheliaceae. It is found in southwestern Bolivia.

Taxonomy
The lichen was formally described as a new species in 2016 by lichenologists Adam Flakus and André Aptroot. It is only known to occur in this habitat in Bolivia.

Description
Although parts of the thallus are –immersed in the bark–the presence of the lichen does not induce the formation of galls in the host. The ascomata are more or less spherical, measuring 0.2–0.5 mm in diameter. Typically, they occur singly, although occasionally 2 or 3 will fuse together. The ostioles have an off-center placement. The lichen contains lichexanthone, which is a lichen product that causes the thallus to fluoresce a yellow colour when . The species epithet xanthoexcentricum refers to two main  of this lichen: the presence of lichexanthone and the eccentric ostiolar placement.

References

Trypetheliaceae
Lichen species
Lichens described in 2016
Lichens of Bolivia
Taxa named by André Aptroot
Taxa named by Adam Grzegorz Flakus